Austria competed at the 1972 Summer Olympics in Munich, West Germany. 111 competitors, 97 men and 14 women, took part in 68 events in 15 sports.

Medalists

Athletics

Men's 100 metres
Axel Nepraunik
 First Heat — 10.61s (→ did not advance)

Men's 4 × 100 m Relay
Georg Regner, Axel Nepraunik, Gunther Würfel, and Helmut Lang
 Heat — 40.49s 
 Semifinals — DNF (→ did not advance)

Boxing

Men's Light Middleweight (– 71 kg)
Franz Csandl
 First Round — Bye 
 Second Round — Lost to Rolando Garbey (CUB), 0:5

Canoeing

Cycling

Five cyclists represented Austria in 1972.

Individual road race
 Roman Humenberger — 14th place
 Johann Summer — 46th place
 Wolfgang Steinmayr — 55th place
 Rudolf Mitteregger — 71st place

Team time trial
 Sigi Denk
 Roman Humenberger
 Rudolf Mitteregger
 Johann Summer

Diving

Men's 3m Springboard:
 Rudolf Kruspel — 293.58 points (→ 31st place)
 Josef Kien — 285.30 points (→ 32nd place)

Men's 10m Platform:
 Nikola Stajkovic — 280.29 points (→ 18th place)
 Rudolf Kruspel — 248.07 points (→ 33rd place)

Women's 10m Platform:
 Ingeborg Pertmayr — 321.03 points (→ 8th place)

Equestrian

Fencing

13 fencers, 8 men and 5 women, represented Austria in 1972.

Men's foil
 Roland Losert

Men's épée
 Rudolf Trost
 Karl-Heinz Müller
 Roland Losert

Men's team épée
 Roland Losert, Karl-Heinz Müller, Herbert Polzhuber, Rudolf Trost

Men's sabre
 Hanns Brandstätter
 Fritz Prause
 Bernd Brodar

Men's team sabre
 Hanns Brandstätter, Bernd Brodar, Fritz Prause, Günther Ulrich

Women's foil
 Elke Radlingmaier
 Hannelore Hradez
 Waltraut Peck-Repa

Women's team foil
 Ingrid Gosch, Hannelore Hradez, Adrienne Krebitz, Elke Radlingmaier, Waltraut Peck-Repa

Judo

Modern pentathlon

Three male pentathletes represented Austria in 1972.

Men's Individual Competition:
 Wolfgang Leu — 4852 points (→ 18th place)
 Peter Zobl-Wessely — 4545 points (→ 35th place)
 Bruno Jerebicnik — 4415 points (→ 44th place)

Men's Team Competition:
 Leu, Zobl-Wessely, and Jerebicnik — 13865 points (→ 11th place)

Rowing

Men's Coxed Pairs
Rainer Hinteregger, Manfred Grieshofer and Werner Grieshofer
Heat — 8:08.88
Repechage — 8:15.94 (→ did not advance)

Sailing

Open

Shooting

Seven male shooters represented Austria in 1972. Rudolf Dollinger won bronze in the 50 m pistol event.
Open

Swimming

Weightlifting

Wrestling

References

Nations at the 1972 Summer Olympics
1972 Summer Olympics
Summer Olympics